Kuczyński, Kuczynski, Kuchinsky, Kuchinski or Kuchinskiy is a Balto-Slavic surname.

People

Kuczynski, Kuczynska 
 Alex Kuczynski (born 1967), American journalist
 Bert Kuczynski (1920–1997), American baseball and football player
Fridrich Kuczynski (1914-1948/9) a member of the Organization Schmelt, sentenced to death for being responsible of 100,000 Holocaust Jewish victims.
 Chris Korwin-Kuczynski (born 1953), Canadian politician
 Iwona Kuczyńska (born 1961), Polish tennis player
 Jan Kuczyński (1935–2009), Polish wrestler
 John Kuczynski (born 1973), American darts player
 Julius Kuczynski (1914–2000) AKA Pee Wee King, American musician
 Jürgen Kuczynski (1904–1997), German economist, spouse of Marguerite
 Kamil Kuczyński (born 1985), Polish cyclist
 Marguerite Kuczynski (1904–1998), German economist, social scientist, spouse of Jürgen
 Maxime Hans Kuczynski (1890–1967), German-Peruvian physician
 Pavel Kuczynski (1846–1897), Polish composer
 Pedro Pablo Kuczynski (born 1938), Peruvian politician and economist
 Robert René Kuczynski (1876–1947), German economist and demographer
 Stefan Kuczyński (disambiguation), multiple individuals
 Ursula Kuczynski (1907–2000), German author and spy for the Soviet Union

Kuchinsky, Kuchinskaya, and other forms 
 Elena Kuchinskaya (born 1984), Russian racing cyclist
 Mikhail Kuchinsky (1911–1995), Soviet Air Force officer
 Natalia Kuchinskaya (born 1949), Russian artistic gymnast
 Valeriy P. Kuchinsky (born 1944), Ukrainian diplomat and politician

See also
 
 
 Kuczyńskie
 Kucinski
 Kulczyński
 Kaczyński

References

Polish-language surnames